Miguel José Oliveira Silva Santos (born 21 October 1994) is a Portuguese professional footballer who plays as a goalkeeper for Liga Portugal 2 club Trofense.

Santos spent his youth with Benfica, SC Lourel, Belenenses, and Estoril, before spending the 2015–16 season as Benfica B's first choice goalkeeper. He signed with English club Port Vale for a five-month spell in August 2016, before moving on to Eerste Divisie side Fortuna Sittard in January 2017. He helped Fortuna win promotion out of the Eerste Divisie at the end of the 2017–18 season. He signed with Romanian side Astra Giurgiu in August 2018 and was loaned out to Academica Clinceni for the 2019–20 season. He joined Dutch club Roda in October 2020, and then returned to Portugal to sign for Mafra in July 2021. He moved on to Trofense 12 months later.

Career

Benfica B
Sanots joined Benfica's junior team from Estoril in 2013. He made his Segunda Liga debut for Benfica B in a 3–2 defeat to Atlético CP at the Benfica Campus on 17 August, when he came on as a substitute for Wei Huang following goalkeeper Bruno Varela's sending off. He made one further appearance in the 2013–14 campaign, before he established himself as Benfica B's first choice goalkeeper in February 2015 and played ten games at the end of the 2014–15 season. He played 37 of Benfica B's 46 league games in the 2015–16 season.

Port Vale
On 31 August 2016, Santos signed a two-year contract with English League One club Port Vale. He had already been training at Vale Park for several weeks before signing, and said that his aim was to replace Jak Alnwick as the club's first choice goalkeeper. He made his debut for the "Valiants" in a 1–0 defeat to Mansfield Town in an EFL Trophy Northern Group E match at Vale Park on 4 October. He made a second appearance in the same competition, keeping a clean sheet and saving two penalties in the resulting shoot-out with Doncaster Rovers; first-team coach Andy Smith praised Santos after the game, saying "It was an outstanding performance... he is a top quality goalkeeper". After Michael Brown succeeded Bruno Ribeiro as manager, Santos left the club by mutual consent in January 2017.

Fortuna Sittard
Santos joined Dutch Eerste Divisie club Fortuna Sittard in January 2017. He played 19 league games for Fortuna in the second half of the 2016–17 season. He played 25 matches for "Fortunezen" during the 2017–18 season as the club won promotion to the Eredivisie as runners-up of the Eerste Divisie.

Astra Giurgiu
On 15 August 2018, Santos signed a four-year contract with Romanian Liga I club Astra Giurgiu. Manager Marius Măldărășanu expected him to compete with Bulgarian goalkeeper Plamen Iliev for a first-team place. However he remained only a back-up to David Lazar and was restricted to four appearances at the Stadionul Marin Anastasovici in the 2018–19 season, and was an unused substitute in the Cupa României final defeat to Viitorul Constanța at the Ilie Oană Stadium. On 19 August 2019, he joined Liga I rivals Academica Clinceni on loan for the rest of the 2019–20 season.

Roda JC Kerkrade
On 5 October 2020, he returned to the Netherlands and signed with Eerste Divisie club Roda JC Kerkrade. He featured nine times in the 2020–21 campaign as Groningen loanee Jan Hoekstra was preferred in goal.

Return to Portugal
On 30 July 2021, he returned to Portugal and signed with Mafra. Manager Ricardo Sousa selected him for 23 of Mafra's 34 league games, with Brazilian Renan playing the other 11. On 21 July 2022, he signed with league rivals Trofense, where manager Jorge Casquilha was looking for him to provide competition for Tiago Silva.

Career statistics

Honours
Fortuna Sittard
Eerste Divisie second-place promotion: 2017–18

Astra Giurgiu
Cupa României runner-up: 2019

References

1994 births
Living people
People from Oeiras, Portugal
Sportspeople from Lisbon District
Portuguese footballers
Association football goalkeepers
C.F. Os Belenenses players
G.D. Estoril Praia players
S.L. Benfica B players
Port Vale F.C. players
Fortuna Sittard players
FC Astra Giurgiu players
LPS HD Clinceni players
Roda JC Kerkrade players
C.D. Mafra players
C.D. Trofense players
Liga Portugal 2 players
Eerste Divisie players
Liga I players
Portuguese expatriate footballers
Portuguese expatriate sportspeople in England
Portuguese expatriate sportspeople in the Netherlands
Portuguese expatriate sportspeople in Romania
Expatriate footballers in England
Expatriate footballers in the Netherlands
Expatriate footballers in Romania